The Fisher King is a 1991 American fantasy comedy-drama film written by Richard LaGravenese and directed by Terry Gilliam. Starring Robin Williams and Jeff Bridges, with Mercedes Ruehl, Amanda Plummer, and Michael Jeter in supporting roles, the film tells the story of a radio shock jock who tries to find redemption by helping a man whose life he inadvertently shattered. It explores "the intermingling of New York City's usually strictly separated social strata" and has been described as "a modern-day Grail Quest that fused New York romantic comedy with timeless fantasy".

The film was released in the United States by TriStar Pictures on September 20, 1991. It received generally favorable reviews from critics and grossed $72 million on a $24 million budget. At the 64th Academy Awards the film earned five nominations, including Best Actor for Williams and Best Original Screenplay for LaGravenese, with Ruehl winning Best Supporting Actress.

Plot
Jack Lucas, a narcissistic, misanthropic shock jock, becomes suicidal and despondent when his insensitive on-air comments inadvertently prompt a mentally unstable caller to commit a mass murder–suicide at a Manhattan restaurant. Three years later, Jack is working for his girlfriend Anne in a video store, and is in a mostly drunken, depressed state.

One night, while on a bender, he contemplates suicide. However, he is attacked and nearly set on fire by thugs who mistake him for a homeless person. He is rescued by Parry, a delusional homeless man who claims his mission is to find the Holy Grail.

Parry tries to enlist Jack's help in getting the grail, explaining that the Fisher King was charged by God with finding the Holy Grail, but incurred an incapacitating wound for his sin of pride. "A Fool asks the King why he suffers, and when the King says he is thirsty, the Fool gives him a cup of water to drink. The King realizes the cup is the Grail and asks, 'How did you find what my brightest and bravest could not?' The Fool said 'I don't know. I only knew that you were thirsty.'"

Jack is initially reluctant but acquiesces after learning that he is partially responsible for Parry's current condition. Parry, whose real name is Henry Sagan, had been a teacher at Hunter College. After witnessing his wife's gruesome death at the same mass shooting Jack had provoked, Henry had a psychotic break and became catatonic. When he woke, he had taken the persona of Parry and became obsessed with the legend of the Fisher King. With Parry as his shielding persona, mentions of reality panic him and he is continually haunted by a terrifying, hallucinatory Red Knight, from a distorted memory of his wife's head exploding from a shotgun blast.

Jack seeks to redeem himself by helping Parry find love again. Lydia, a shy woman with whom Parry is smitten, is prodded into meeting Parry and joining Jack and Anne for a dinner date. Afterwards, Parry walks Lydia home and declares his love for her; she reciprocates, but the brush with reality summons the Red Knight. Fleeing his vision and the memory of his wife's murder, he is ambushed by the same thugs against whom he had defended Jack. Beaten mercilessly, Parry becomes catatonic again. Jack, feeling whole again after 'saving' Parry, breaks up with Anne and begins to rebuild his career, but has a crisis of conscience during a sitcom pitch after snubbing a vagrant who had previously done him a favor.

After finding out what happened to Parry, Jack dons Parry's clothing and infiltrates the Upper East Side castle of a famous architect and retrieves the "Grail", a trophy which Parry believes to be the real Grail. During the theft, Jack finds the architect unconscious from attempting suicide. He triggers the alarm while leaving, alerting authorities and saving the man's life.

When he brings the “Grail” to Parry, Parry regains consciousness and tells a silent Jack he's ready to miss his wife now. Lydia comes to visit Parry in the hospital; she finds him awake and leading the patients of the ward in a rendition of "How About You?" with Jack. Parry and Lydia embrace, and Jack reconciles with Anne, telling her that he loves her. She slaps him, but then grabs and kisses him. Later, Jack and Parry lie naked in Central Park gazing at the clouds, as a fireworks display over New York presents "The End".

Cast

Production
During an appearance on an episode of The Directors, Gilliam stated that he wanted to do the film because he was tired of big budget special effects films, such as his previous film The Adventures of Baron Munchausen, which went over budget and cost over $45 million, nearly twice as much as The Fisher King'''s budget of $24 million. This was the first film Gilliam directed in which he was not involved in writing the screenplay, as well as his first film not to feature any other members of Monty Python.

According to The Directors episode, Gilliam came up with the scene where Robin Williams and Amanda Plummer meet during a huge waltz in the middle of Grand Central Terminal, because he felt the scene LaGravenese had written, in which a large group of people in a crowded subway listen to a homeless woman sing with a beautiful voice that fills the room, wasn't working. He was hesitant about this at first, because his original intentions were just to shoot the script and the waltz would make it "a Terry Gilliam film". The scene was shot in one night with a mix of professional extras and passengers alighting from the train.

Reception

Box office
The film did moderately well at the box office, with a gross of almost $42 million in the United States and Canada, and an international gross of $30.5 milion, for a worldwide total of $72.4 million.

Critical response

Peter Travers of Rolling Stone wrote that the film "sweeps you up on waves of humor, heartbreak and ravishing romance". John Simon of the conservative National Review described The Fisher King as "one of the most nonsensical, pretentious, mawkishly cloying movies I ever had to wretch through."

Following Robin Williams' death, a re-appraisal of the film on RogerEbert.com stated that "no Williams film can hit harder — or be so fully consoling in such heartbreaking circumstances — than The Fisher King", where his character "gradually simmers to a boil of bristling insecurities, terror and agonizing internalized pain".

On Rotten Tomatoes, the film has an approval rating of 84% based on 62 reviews, with an average rating of 7.1/10. The site's critics consensus reads, "An odd but affecting mixture of drama, comedy and fantasy, The Fisher King'' manages to balance moving performances from Robin Williams and Jeff Bridges with director Terry Gilliam's typically askew universe." On Metacritic, the film has a weighted average score of 61 out of 100, based on nine critics, indicating "generally favorable reviews". Audiences surveyed by CinemaScore gave the film a grade "B+" on scale of A to F.

Accolades

Home media

Laserdisc 
The film was released on VHS and Laserdisc by Columbia TriStar Home Video in 1992. The first Laserdisc release was a full-screen, but showed more vertical information while cropping horizontally. The second release in 1997 presents the film in its theatrical ratio of 1.85:1.  The Criterion Collection released their Laserdisc version in 1993 with several extras that have not surfaced on any other release, and a director-approved widescreen transfer in 1.66:1.

DVD and Blu-ray 
The film was first released on DVD in 1998 by Columbia TriStar Home Video, using the same master as the 1997 Laserdisc release, with only theatrical trailer as a special feature. This release was one of the oldest DVD titles to still remain in print. In 2011, Image Entertainment released the film on Blu-ray utilizing a new HD master in the theatrical ratio of 1.85:1, with Dolby Digital Tru-HD 5.1 surround, with no special features.

On June 23, 2015, The Criterion Collection re-released the film on Blu-ray and DVD featuring a brand new 2K transfer and DTS-HD 5.1 surround sound mix.

See also
 List of films based on Arthurian legend

References

External links

 
 
 
 
 Dreams: The Fisher King
 The Fisher King: In the Kingdom of the Imperfect an essay by Bilge Ibiri at the Criterion Collection

1991 films
1990s fantasy comedy-drama films
American fantasy comedy-drama films
Arthurian films
1990s English-language films
Films about atonement
Films about the Holy Grail
Films about homelessness
Films about post-traumatic stress disorder
Films about radio people
Films directed by Terry Gilliam
Films featuring a Best Musical or Comedy Actor Golden Globe winning performance
Films featuring a Best Supporting Actress Academy Award-winning performance
Films featuring a Best Supporting Actress Golden Globe-winning performance
Films produced by Debra Hill
Films produced by Lynda Obst
Films scored by George Fenton
Films set in New York City
TriStar Pictures films
Toronto International Film Festival People's Choice Award winners
1990s American films